San Bernardino is a district of the Cordillera Department, Paraguay.
San Bernardino or San Ber is a town in Paraguay, located on the shores of Ypacarai Lake in the Cordillera Department. It is a popular holiday resort for people from Asunción, and both Alfredo Stroessner and former Nicaraguan president Anastasio Somoza have had lakehouses there.

The town contains a museum, a rathaus, a bierstube and a cemetery that contains the grave of Los Paraguayos singer Luis Alberto del Paraná.

The town was founded in 1881 by German immigrants who named the town New Bavaria. More Germans came from Tanganyika and the Sudetenland after the First World War, though the town was renamed after General Bernardino Caballero, president of Paraguay from 1880 to 1886.

The Lake Hotel in San Bernardino was where the German nationalist Dr. Bernhard Förster spent the last six weeks of his life, before committing suicide on 3 June 1889 by taking an overdose of strychnine. Inspired by the writing of Richard Wagner, and because of his own strong anti-semitism, he set out to establish a German settlement in Paraguay with his wife Elisabeth Förster née Nietzsche (sister of the philosopher, Friedrich Nietzsche) and some German families. Their efforts, at a site called Nueva Germania, failed dismally causing Förster to leave for San Bernardino.

Förster was buried in the town's cemetery. As Nazism became increasingly popular amongst Paraguay's German community in the 1930s, Förster became something of a hero. In 1934, Adolf Hitler ordered a small memorial service to take place at his graveside, with German soil sent to sprinkle over the grave.

 

es:Distrito de San Bernardino